Thomas Richards PC (8 June 1859 – 7 November 1931) was a Welsh trade unionist and politician.

Born in Beaufort, Richards was educated at the Beaufort British School, before becoming a coal miner at the age of twelve.  In 1884, he was the main founder of the Ebbw Vale and Sirhowy Colliery Workmen's Association, serving as its secretary and agent.  The association became part of the South Wales Miners' Federation in 1898, Richards continuing as agent of its Ebbw Vale District until 1901, while also becoming the first general secretary of the SWMF.

Richards was a supporter of the Liberal-Labour movement, and was elected to Monmouthshire County Council in 1904.  That year, he won a by-election to become Member of Parliament for West Monmouthshire.  In 1909, he was instructed by his trade union to resign the Liberal whip and take the Labour whip and at both the 1910 General Elections he stood as a Labour candidate. He held the seat until its abolition at the 1918 general election, when he was elected for the new Ebbw Vale constituency. He resigned from Parliament in 1920.

Out of Parliament, Richards devoted his time to the SWMF, and the Miners' Federation of Great Britain (MFGB).  He represented them on the General Council of the Trades Union Congress from 1925, and served as President of the MFGB from 1929 to 1930.

Richards was made a Privy Councillor in 1918.

References

External links
 
 Archives Network Wales – Thomas Richards

1859 births
1931 deaths
Liberal-Labour (UK) MPs
Welsh Labour Party MPs
Members of the Privy Council of the United Kingdom
Miners' Federation of Great Britain-sponsored MPs
UK MPs 1900–1906
UK MPs 1906–1910
UK MPs 1910
UK MPs 1910–1918
UK MPs 1918–1922
British trade union leaders
Presidents of the National Union of Mineworkers (Great Britain)
Vice Presidents of the National Union of Mineworkers (Great Britain)
Presidents of the Trades Union Congress
20th-century Welsh people
19th-century Welsh people
20th-century Welsh politicians
19th-century Welsh politicians
Liberal Party (UK) MPs for Welsh constituencies